Zhu Feng (1905–1950) was a Communist Chinese intelligence agent who worked undercover in Taiwan during 1949 gathering information on the Government of the Republic of China (ROC). She completed several missions, successfully transmitting data on military layouts before being arrested in 1950 and subsequently executed. In 2011, after 60 years her ashes were returned to her family in Nanjing and later buried at Babaoshan Revolutionary Cemetery.

Life
Zhu was born in 1905 in Ningbo, Zhejiang Province into a wealthy family that ran a local fishery trade association. She studied at Ningbo Normal School for Women (now part of Ningbo University) where she was introduced to revolutionary ideology. After college, she married engineer Chen Shouqing and the couple moved back to Ningbo following the Mukden Incident. A few years later Chen died of cholera and Zhu remarried, working alongside her new husband Zhu Xiaoguang, whom she had a son with. She operated a bookstore distributing anti-Japanese propaganda. In 1945 she joined the Chinese Communist Party and three years later was sent to Hong Kong as a spy at the Hong Kong Hezhong Trading Corporation.

After working in Hong Kong, she was dispatched to Taiwan in 1949 to gather military intelligence on the Kuomintang who had recently fled from mainland China to re-establish their government on the island. She met with two undercover agents: Cai Xiaoqian, secretary of Taiwan CPC Working Committee and Wu Shi, a CPC intelligence worker serving at a high-ranking post in the ROC government. They reported having organised armed forces to aid the People's Liberation Army in taking Taiwan and passed her microfilm with military plans.

After having the microfilm successfully smuggled off the island via Keelung Port, Cai Xiaoqian was exposed as a spy and broke under interrogation revealing Zhu's identity and the CPC's plan to invade Taiwan. After a failed attempt to commit suicide, Zhu was arrested in February 1950, tried and executed by firing squad on 10 June 1950 in Taipei. The CPC declared her a martyr of the revolution.

Return of remains
In 2001 the Shandong Pictorial Publishing House printed two photos of Zhu Feng, one at her trial clutching a railing and one shortly before her execution. The photos were seen by her family in Nanjing and prompted them to request her ashes be returned to them from the ROC government.
After a decade of searching, scholars managed to locate Zhu Feng's remains at the Fude Cemetery of Taipei and on 9 December 2011 they were returned to Mainland China to be buried at the Babaoshan Revolutionary Cemetery.

References

1905 births
1950 deaths
People from Ningbo
People convicted of spying for the People's Republic of China
Chinese prisoners and detainees
Female wartime spies
People executed by Taiwan by firearm
Executed spies
Executed People's Republic of China people
Executed people from Zhejiang
Women in war in China